Frühstück is a Polish rock band from Wrocław, Poland. The band started making music in 1997, and their frontman is Martijn Krale. Their first studio album, Quiet, was released in 2012 by Youngside Records.

Background
Frühstück is of the hard rock variety, from Wrocław, Poland. Their members are lead vocalist, Martijn Krale, guitarist, Marcin Karel (Szczypior), bassist, Wojtek Karel (Łoś), and drummer, Tomek Kuźbik (Scottie).

Music history
The band commenced as a musical entity in 1997, with their major studio album release, Quiet, that was released by Youngside Records on 3 March 2012.

Members
Current members
 Martijn Krale - vocal
 Wojtek Karel (Łoś) - bass
 Tomek Kuźbik (Scottie) - drums
 Marcin Karel (Szczypior) - guitars

Discography
Studio albums
 Mine (2000)
 Muza (2003)
 Quiet (2012, Youngside)
 Story (2014)
 Brother (2015)

References

External links
Official website

Christian rock groups
Polish hard rock musical groups
Musical groups established in 1997